Melanson is a community in the Canadian province of Nova Scotia, located in  Kings County.

References
 Melanson on Destination Nova Scotia

Communities in Kings County, Nova Scotia